Hans-Jacob Emanuel "Knubben" Mattsson (2 June 1890 – 1 December 1980) was a Swedish ice hockey player who competed in the 1920 Summer Olympics. In 1920 he was a member of the Swedish ice hockey team which finished fourth in the Summer Olympics tournament. He played one match.

References

External links
 
profile

1890 births
1980 deaths
Ice hockey players at the 1920 Summer Olympics
Olympic ice hockey players of Sweden
Swedish ice hockey players